AQB may refer to:

 Al-Quds Brigades, the armed wing of Palestinian Islamic Jihad
 AQB, the IATA code for Quiché Airport, Santa Cruz del Quiché, Guatemala